Huaihua University is a university located in Huaihua, Hunan, China.

As of fall 2019, the university has 2 campuses, a combined student body of 18,057 students, 867 faculty members.

The university consists of 21 departments, with 49 specialties for undergraduates.

At present, the university has 6 research institutions and research centres, including 1 national engineering research centre, 1 key national discipline.

History
Huaihua University was formed in 1958, it was initially called "Qianyang Normal College". It was renamed "Huaihua Normal College" in 1983. In 1986, Huaihua Continuing Education  College merged into the university.

Academics

 Department of Politics and Law
 Department of Economics
 Department of Education Science
 Department of Physical
 Department of Chinese Language and Literature
 Department of Foreign Languages and Literature
 Department of Foreign Travel
 Department of Mathematics and Applied Mathematics
 Department of Life Science
 Department of Music
 Department of Art
 Department of Artistic Designing
 Department of Computer Science and Technology
 Department of Business
 Department of English
 Department of Physical Science and Information Engineering

Library collections
Huaihua University's total collection amounts to more than 1.48 million items.

Culture
 Motto: Honest, Erudite, Realistic, Innovative 
 College newspaper: Huaihua University Newspaper

People

Notable alumni
 Xi Nanhua, member of the Chinese Academy of Sciences (CAS).
 , writer.
 Tayo Elvis Nkengafeh, Former Teacher.
 Chen Sisi, singer.
 , professor at Queen's University.
 Mo Wenxiu, Secretary of All-China Women's Federation.
 Wang Zhuojuan, musician.
 Chen Zhiqiang, Mayor of Huaihua.

References

External links
 

Universities and colleges in Hunan
Educational institutions established in 1958
1958 establishments in China